Susan Crabtree is a political correspondent for RealClearPolitics. She previously served as a senior writer for the Washington Free Beacon, and spent five years as a White House Correspondent for the Washington Examiner. Prior stints include seven years as a senior editor and investigative reporter for The Hill. She is a frequent guest political analyst on Fox News, CNN, MSNBC as well as numerous radio shows.

Before joining The Hill, Crabtree covered Congress for Congressional Quarterly. She also spent three years as a reporter for Roll Call newspaper, chronicling the House Republican leadership, Congress' response to the Sept. 11 attacks, as well as trade disputes and spending battles.

Crabtree has written for several magazines, including The Weekly Standard and The Economist-owned Capital Style, where she was a senior writer.

She graduated with honors in broadcast journalism and political science from the University of Southern California.

References

External links

Appearance on Fox News 
Appearance on CNN

Living people
University of Southern California alumni
American political writers
American women journalists
The Washington Times people
1970s births
USC Annenberg School for Communication and Journalism alumni
Journalists from Kansas
People from Topeka, Kansas
21st-century American women